Anthony Cheshire is a scientist, former public servant and former Chief Professor of SARDI Aquatic Sciences in South Australia (2000-2005). During his time in the role, his research work supported the development of the state's Southern bluefin tuna seacage aquaculture sector. He also participated in various scientific discoveries, including the discovery of 8 new species of jellyfish collected from the Great Australian Bight and other field research trips.

Southern bluefin tuna research 
A substantial proportion of Cheshire's research work focused on the environmental impacts of tuna farming in Spencer Gulf. Subjects included early investigations of the environmental effect of tuna seacages, measurement and modeling of nitrogen loads, sediment geochemistry, developing a methodology for assessing seabed impacts, nutrient influence on the seabed, waste mitigation, oxygen availability in sea cages, net fouling communities and synthetic anti-fouling treatments, and regional monitoring systems. He also researched means of lowering the cost of environment assessments for the tuna aquaculture sector and helped improve net designs to allow Great white sharks that enter sea-cages by leaping or biting their way in to be released without harm.

References 

Aquaculture in Australia
Living people
Year of birth missing (living people)
Public servants of South Australia